Na izvoru svetlosti (trans. At the Spring of Light) is the second and the last studio album by Yugoslav progressive rock band Pop Mašina, released in 1975.

Background and recording
The album was recorded from September 4–7, 1975 in Akademik Studio in Ljubljana, with the exception of the blues track "Negde daleko", recorded on the band's performance in Belgrade Sports Hall on 2 January 1974. It was produced by the band's bass guitarist and vocalist Robert Nemeček and Ivo Umek. The album featured guest appearances by S Vremena Na Vreme member Ljuba Ninković and keyboardist and composer Sloba Marković. Both of them appeared as guests on Pop Mašina's previous album, Kiselina (Acid).

The song "Rekvijem za prijatelja" ("Requiem for a Friend"), with lyrics written by Ljuba Ninković, was dedicated to Predrag Jovičić, the vocalist of the band San, who earlier that year died from an electric shock on a concert in Čair Sports Center in Niš. The album featured a new version of the song "Zemlja svetlosti", previously released on a 7-inch single.

Track listing

Personnel
Robert Nemeček – bass guitar, acoustic guitar, percussion, vocals, producer
Zoran Božinović – guitar, vocals
Mihajlo Popović – drums, percussion

Additional personnel
Ljuba Ninkovič – acoustic guitar, percussion
S. Marković – organ, piano, synthesizer
Anton Čare – cello
Stane Demšar – cello
Franjo Bergar – oboe
Božo Mihelčič – violin
Karel Žužek – violin
Ivo Umek – producer
Miro Bevc – engineer
Marko Petretič – recording assistant
Aca Radojčić – recording ("Negde daleko")
Mile Miletić – mixing ("Negde daleko")
Jugoslav Vlahović – cover, graphic design

Reissues
The album was reissued in 2008, on vinyl, by Austrian record label Atlantide.

Legacy
In 2021 the song "Sećanja" was ranked No.58 on the list of 100 Greatest Yugoslav Hard & Heavy Anthems by web magazine Balkanrock.

Covers
The song "Zemlja svetlosti" was covered by Serbian alternative rock band Disciplina Kičme on their 1991 album Nova iznenađenja za nova pokolenja (New Surprises for New Generations).

The song "Sećanja" ("Memories") was covered by Serbian singer-songwriter Nikola Čuturilo on his 2011 album Tu i sad (Here and Now), the track featuring guest appearance by Vidoja Božinović, a member of Pop Mašina's last lineup and Čuturilo's former bandmate from Riblja Čorba.

References 

Na izvoru svetlosti at Discogs

External links 
Na izvoru svetlosti at Discogs

Pop Mašina albums
1975 albums
ZKP RTLJ albums